Baban Yavar-e Azizi (also Romanized as Bābān Yāvar-e ‘Azīzī) is a village in Sanjabi Rural District, Kuzaran District, Kermanshah County, Kermanshah Province, Iran. At the 2006 census, its population was 666, in 143 families.

References 

Populated places in Kermanshah County